Gavrić (Cyrillic script: Гаврић) is a Serbian surname that may refer to:

Momčilo Gavrić (1938–2010), Yugoslav and American footballer (soccer player)
Momčilo Gavrić (1906–1993), youngest corporal in World War I
Ivana Gavrić, British pianist
Dobrosav Gavrić, policeman, assassin of Željko Ražnatović "Arkan", famous Serbian bankrobber, private force commander in the Yugoslav Wars, mobster and businessman

See also
Gavrilović
Gavrović

Serbian surnames
Surnames from given names